Stenoptilodes brevipennis is a moth of the family Pterophoridae. It is known from Argentina, Belize, Brazil, Costa Rica, Cuba, Ecuador, Mexico, Paraguay, Peru, Puerto Rico, Suriname, Trinidad and Uruguay, as well as most of the United States and southern Canada.

Adults are on wing in January, March, April, May, July, November and December.

The larvae feed on Mecardonia acuminata and Russelia equistiformis.

External links

brevipennis
Moths described in 1874
Moths of North America
Moths of South America